Menzil (formerly Durak) is a village in the Kâhta District, Adıyaman Province, Turkey. The village is populated by Kurds of the Kawan tribe and had a population of 2,318 in 2021.

The village is home to a Naqshbandi lodge.

References

Villages in Kâhta District

Kurdish settlements in Adıyaman Province